Karine Shadoyan (born 4 March 1975) is a Russian-born Armenian Freestyle female wrestler.

Shadoyan won a bronze medal at the 2006 European Wrestling Championships. She is the first female wrestler from Armenia to win a medal at the European Wrestling Championships.

References

1975 births
Living people
Armenian wrestlers
Armenian female sport wrestlers
European Wrestling Championships medalists
21st-century Armenian women